Erdőkertes is a village in Pest county, Budapest metropolitan area, Hungary. It has a population of 8,248 (2017). Its name means "Forest Garden" in English.  It is considered to be an up-and-coming property hotspot as it is located within a 30-minute commute to the centre of Budapest. The village has a full range of amenities including a local train station, a park, supermarkets and several schools.

References

Populated places in Pest County